Todd Township may refer to several places:

In Canada

Todd Township, Kenora District, Ontario (geographic / historical)

In the United States

Todd Township, Hubbard County, Minnesota
Todd Township, Craig County, Oklahoma (historical)
Todd Township, Fulton County, Pennsylvania
Todd Township, Huntingdon County, Pennsylvania

See also
Todd (disambiguation)

Township name disambiguation pages